Finding Steve McQueen is a 2019 American heist thriller film directed by Mark Steven Johnson and written by Ken Hixon and Keith Sharon. The film stars Travis Fimmel, Rachael Taylor, Forest Whitaker, and William Fichtner, telling the story of a gang planning to steal millions of dollars from President Nixon's illegal political slush fund. It was released in the United States on March 15, 2019, by Momentum Pictures. The film is based on the United California Bank robbery.

Plot 
In 1980, Harry James Barber tells his story about the California bank burglary he committed eight years ago to his girlfriend Molly Murphy, whose relationship is under strain after discovering his secret.

In 1972, Harry lives next to a refurbished theater house in Pennsylvania and is a big fan of actor Steve McQueen. Harry had agreed to the plan led by the handler Enzo Rotella of burglarizing the bank supposedly containing the illegal slush fund of President Richard Nixon. The team is joined by Paul Callahan, Raymond Darrow, and Harry's brother Tommy Barber - a Vietnam War veteran.

The gang travels to California and rents a vacation house not far away from the bank. Harry meets the widow Molly Murphy at a bar, whose husband was killed in a vehicular accident. Harry and Molly happily develop their relationship, but he hides his secret about his scheme from Molly throughout the relationship. At night, the gang disables the alarm system, and enters the bank vault by blowing a hole into the vault roof with dynamite. After three days of burglary, they successfully loot about $9 million overall; however, Harry receives only $10,000, and the rest of the team go their separate ways. 
After the burglary, the bank job has become public knowledge and FBI agents Howard Lambert and Sharon Price take the case. After a thorough investigation, they eventually locate the vacation house linked to the job and manage to identify the culprits through fingerprints left on unwashed dishes and utensils. All members of the gang are subsequently arrested by the authorities, except Harry who escapes and goes on the run.

In 1980, Harry tells Molly that he is done running from the law and he had called her father, a sheriff, to arrest him. As they get out from the diner, Howard and the local sheriffs arrive and Harry kisses her goodbye before being brought to the detention. The epilogue states that Harry was sentenced to seven years in prison but is reduced to three years after the letter from the Sheriff was signed by the townspeople to attest to Harry's character.

Cast

Production 
Principal photography on the film began in early September 2016 in Atlanta, Georgia.

Scenes were filmed in Dallas, Georgia in early October.

Reception

Box office
Finding Steve McQueen grossed $70 in the United States and Canada and $18,566 in other territories.

Critical reception
The site's critical consensus reads, "Finding Steve McQueens title invites thoughts of old-school action classics, but this energetic heist picture is disappointingly thrill-deficient." On Metacritic, the film has a weighted average score of 56 out of 100, based on 9 critics, indicating "mixed or average reviews".

References

External links 
 
 
 

2019 crime thriller films
2010s heist films
American crime thriller films
American heist films
American nonlinear narrative films
Films directed by Mark Steven Johnson
Films set in 1972
Films set in 1980
Films set in Youngstown, Ohio
Films set in Orange County, California
Films set in Pennsylvania
Films shot in Atlanta
2019 films
2010s English-language films
2010s American films